Max Reinhardt (born 14 May 1951) is a radio presenter known for presenting Late Junction on BBC Radio 3.

Career
Reinhardt was a presenter for Late Junction, a music programme broadcast three nights a week on BBC Radio 3. In addition, he was the musical consultant for the South African music series Freedom Sounds on BBC Radio 2, presented a documentary on BBC Radio 4 about his theatre piece Ketubah and is a regular presenter of Global Beats on BBC World Service.

As well as his work with the BBC, Reinhardt is the musical director at Oily Cart a company established in 1981 that works with children with complex disabilities.

He also edited the memoir of Jewish-Algerian pianist Maurice El Mediouni, published in 2017 by Repeater Books.

Personal life
He lives in London, England and enjoys a wide range of music.

References

1951 births
Living people
BBC Radio 3 presenters
Radio presenters from London